Aldin Grange for Bearpark railway station was located on the Lanchester Valley Railway that operated in County Durham, England. The railway station opened in 1883 as Aldin Grange, and was renamed Aldin Grange for Bearpark about a year later. In 1927 its name was changed to Bearpark. The station closed to passengers in 1939, although miners' gala excursions used the line until 1954, and freight then used the line until 1965.

History
Opened as part of the North Eastern Railway, it became part of the London and North Eastern Railway during the Grouping of 1923, and that company withdrew regular passenger services in 1939. Occasional excursions to the Durham Miners Gala joined the goods and Bearpark Colliery traffic until the last gala excursion in 1954, after the line had passed to the Eastern Region of British Railways on nationalisation in 1948. Goods traffic continued until 1966 and the line was lifted in 1967.

The Site Today
Today the site is a popular walk, the Lanchester Valley Railway Path. Nothing of the station remains.

References

External links
 Station on navigable O.S. map
 Sub Brit Page
 Lanchester Valley Railway Path

Disused railway stations in County Durham
Former North Eastern Railway (UK) stations
Railway stations in Great Britain opened in 1883
Railway stations in Great Britain closed in 1954
Bearpark